Xingjing (Xiao'erjing: ثٍْ‌ڭٍْ جٍ) is a town under the administration of Xixia District, Yinchuan, Ningxia, China. , it has 3 residential communities and 6 villages under its administration.

References 

Township-level divisions of Ningxia
Yinchuan